Immerwahr is a surname. Notable people with the surname include:

 Clara Immerwahr (1870–1915), German chemist
 Daniel Immerwahr, American historian
 Sara Anderson Immerwahr (1914–2008), American Classical archaeologist
 Stephen Immerwahr, American musician

German-language surnames